Moses Orkuma (born 19 July 1994) is a Nigerian footballer who plays as a midfielder.

Career

In 2016, Orkuma signed for Libyan side Al Ahli SC.

In 2017, he signed for Stade Gabèsien in Tunisia.

In 2020, he signed for Qatari club Umm Salal SC.

Orkuma has described playing for the Nigeria national under-20 team as the highlight of his career.

References

External links
 

Living people
1994 births
Nigerian footballers
Nigerian expatriate footballers
Association football midfielders
Lobi Stars F.C. players
Al-Ahli SC (Tripoli) players
Étoile Sportive du Sahel players
Al-Ahly SC (Benghazi) players
Stade Gabèsien players
US Monastir (football) players
Umm Salal SC players
Nigeria Professional Football League players
Tunisian Ligue Professionnelle 1 players
Qatar Stars League players
Expatriate footballers in Libya
Expatriate footballers in Tunisia
Expatriate footballers in Qatar
Nigerian expatriate sportspeople in Libya
Nigerian expatriate sportspeople in Tunisia
Nigerian expatriate sportspeople in Qatar
Libyan Premier League players
People from Gboko